Welcome is an unincorporated community in St. John the Baptist Parish, Louisiana, United States. The community is located near the east bank of the Mississippi River between Garyville and Reserve.

References

Unincorporated communities in St. John the Baptist Parish, Louisiana
Unincorporated communities in Louisiana